In the United States, a registration statement is a set of documents, including a prospectus, which a company must file with the U.S. Securities and Exchange Commission before it proceeds with a public offering.

See also
Securities Act of 1933
Form S-3

References

U.S. Securities and Exchange Commission